Kandahar is a 2010 Indian Malayalam-language war film written and directed by Major Ravi. It is the third installment in the Major Mahadevan film series, with Mohanlal reprising his role as Major Mahadevan after the 2006 film Keerthi Chakra and 2008 film Kurukshetra. The film also stars Bollywood Actor, Amitabh Bachchan and Tamil Actor, Ganesh Venkatraman in their Malayalam film debut.

The plot is based on the hijacking of the Indian Airlines Flight 814 in 1999. The political situation is portrayed from an Indian perspective in the film. Kandahar was released on 16 December 2010, along with its dubbed versions in Tamil and Hindi languages.

The film's sound design was done by Baylon Fonseca. Kandahar was co-produced by Sunil Nair and Mohanlal. It was marketed online by Shaz Shabeer Strikers and Crew Kochi. The film, unlike the prequels, received negative reviews.

Synopsis 
Major Mahadevan and his unit undertake a mission to deal with an international terrorist organisation after a group of hardcore terrorists hijack a plane.

Plot 

Suryanatha Sharma (Ganesh Venkatraman) is an educated, unemployed man. His father, Lokanatha Sharma (played by Amitabh Bachchan), wants to see his son victorious in life. Things change when he meets Major Mahadevan (Mohanlal). Though, their initial encounter is hostile at first, Suryanath apologizes to Mahadevan for his rudeness, and impressed with Suryanath and seeing potential in him, he suggests him to join the Army. Though he struggles a bit in the beginning, Suryanath is able to pass  out of the Indian Military Academy with flying colours.

After graduating, he joins the NSG (National Security Guard) as a commando where he joins Mahadevan's crew. Soon after, an Air India flight becomes hijacked by hardcore terrorists whose objective was to have the Indian government release their leader who was caught by Mahadevan himself. They are then forced to land in New Delhi to refuel. Mahadevan and his crew are able to infiltrate the plane through the wheels, even though their superior ordered them not to.

Once inside the plane they are able to find out the number of terrorists who are inside and quickly kill them and their leader and retake the plane. However a sleeper cell reveals himself and shoot the pilots and Suryanath injuring them. Mahadevan and Suryanath take control of the plane and with the pilot's guidance are able to land plane. But Suryanath unfortunately dies from his injuries.  He is given a hero's funeral with honour after which Mahadevan consoles Lokanath,  who reveals that he is proud of his son and thanks Major Mahadevan for making his son a hero.

Cast 
 Mohanlal as Major Mahadevan, NSG Commanding officer
 Amitabh Bachchan as Lokanatha Sharma
 Ganesh Venkatraman as Captain Suryanatha Sharma, NSG officer
 Ragini Dwivedi as Aishwarya, Surya's fiance
 Sumalatha as Sumangaly, wife of Lokanatha Sharma
 Ananya as a student
 Major Ravi as Havildar Major Shiva
 K. P. A. C. Lalitha as Pathumma
 Mamukkoya as Mullah
 N. L. Balakrishnan as Ballston 
 Joemon Joshy as Cadet Kishore
 Major Kishore as NSG Commando Nair
 Naveen Arakkal as Naveen, NSG Commando
 Suresh Nair as Cadet
 Saju Attingal as NSG Commando
 Renjith Reghu
 Anoop Chandran as Selvan
 Pradeep Chandran as Senior Officer
 Jaffer Idukki as Mani
 S.P.Sreekumar as Cadet
 Kannan Pattambi
 Shrikant Kamat
 Soorya J Menon
 Nawab Shah as Cadet Instructor
 Ragasya

Production

Development

Kandahar is the third film in the "Major Mahadevan series", the previous ones being Kirtichakra (2006) and Kurukshetra (2008). Kirtichakra was a runaway success in Kerala, and Kurukshetra was a superhit. Jeeva played a supporting role in Kirtichakra and Siddique in Kurukshetra. This time Ganesh Venkatraman is playing the supporting role. Surya was supposed to do the role but was replaced by Ganesh when he opted out of the project due to date clashes with 7aam Arivu.

Casting
Mohanlal plays the lead role and is the film's producer. Several other artists from Tamil cinema were initially approached to play secondary leads as well, including Suriya and Arun Vijay, who all cited date conflicts. Later, Ganesh Venkatraman was finalized for a role. Amitabh Bachchan was approached for a major role in the film, and he immediately agreed. Even though he did not ask for any remuneration for his appearance, he was offered a whopping 8 crores. His son in Kandahar is played by Ganesh Venkatraman. Later, model and Kannada actress,  Ragini Dwivedi was signed up to play a supporting role. There were reports that Parvathy Omanakuttan was also cast in the film.

Filming
At a press conference, Major Ravi reported that the aeroplane sequences of the film would be shot in Russia. Other locations include Ooty and New Delhi.

Release
The film was released on 16 December 2010 in 111 theatres in Kerala, 9 theatres in Bengaluru, 5 theatres in Chennai, and around 18 theatres in Mumbai, Delhi, Pune and Hyderabad. Kandahar has collected  5.25 crores revenue from before releasing through selling satellite rights, audio rights, video rights, overseas distribution rights, and theatre advances.

Reception
Kandahar received negative reviews upon release. Though it was one of the most-awaited films of the year, it failed to attain a good word-of-mouth. A review by Sify, which rated it "below average" said, "There are moments when every Indian would feel proud about being born in this great land, but the shaky script, ordinary action sequences and a faulty climax lets the film down." Rediff published a nearly negative review saying, "A better script would have perhaps made the return of Major Mahadevan more appealing." It rated the film 2.5 in a scale of five. OneIndia gave the movie a 3/5 rating,

Accolades
 Asianet Film Awards
2010 - Best Feature Film on National Integration Award - Major Ravi

Soundtrack

 
The soundtrack features five songs composed by Shamir Tandon, who is known for his compositions in Madhur Bhandarkar's films, with lyrics by Sandeep Nath, Vayalar Sarath Chandra Varma, Sudhakar Sharma, and Kaushal Kishor.

References

External links
 

2010 films
2010s war films
Films set in Afghanistan
2010s Malayalam-language films
Indian aviation films
Films about terrorism in India
Indian war films
Films shot in Ooty
Films about aviation accidents or incidents
Films about aircraft hijackings
Thriller films based on actual events
Indian films based on actual events
Films set on airplanes
Pranavam Arts International films
Indian sequel films
HMajor3
Indian Army in films
Films scored by Shamir Tandon
Films directed by Major Ravi
2000 millennium attack plots
Films about jihadism